Bobi may refer to:

 Bobi, Ivory Coast, a village in Woroba District, Ivory Coast
 Bobi, Uganda, a town in Gulu District, Northern Uganda
 Bobi (dog), (born 1992) the oldest dog to ever live

People
 Slobodan Bobi Božinovski (born 1981), Macedonian footballer
 Robert Bobi Jones (1929–2017), Welsh Christian academic and prolific writer in Welsh
 Nickname of Boban Marjanović (born 1988), Serbian basketball player
 Blagoja Milevski (born 1971), Macedonian football manager and former player
 Boban Mitev (born 1972), Macedonian basketball coach
 Boban Bobi Mojsovski (born 1992), Macedonian singer
 Bobi Sourander (1928–2008), Finnish-Swedish author and journalist
 Bobi Tsankov (1979–2019), Bulgarian journalist, crime writer and radio personality
 Bobi Verdeș (born 1980), Romanian footballer
 Bobi Wine, stage name of Uganda musician Robert Ssentamu Kyagulanyi (born 1982)
 Gani Bobi (1943–1995), Albanian philosopher and sociologist
 a short form of Boyan in Bulgaria